"Happy Now" is a 2018 song by Norwegian DJ Kygo featuring the vocals of Swedish singer Sandro Cavazza. It was released on 26 October 2018 and became a big hit in Norway and Sweden, and it charted in a number of European charts and in Australia.

Background
The song originally debuted at 2018 iHeartRadio Music Festival. Kygo stated in a press release he recorded it in Los Angeles before the Summer, explaining: "I discovered Cavazza through Avicii's music and have been a big fan ever since, We talked a lot about how much Avicii's music has meant to us".

Content
"Happy Now" is believed to be his tribute to the late Avicii. Will Heffernan of Celebmix wrote that has "classic Kygo sounds and a lyrical message of loss". It is written in the key of A major, with a tempo of 118 beats per minute.

Critical reception
Karlie Powell of Your EDM commented that it "sound[s] like a little glimmer of happiness, though it’s a tinge bittersweet. Allow it to move your emotions with every play through".

Music video
An accompanying video was released on 1 December 2018. It notably marks the first time Kygo has starred in his own music video where he takes the viewer to an inside look of his own family and friends, in Norway where he grew up.

Credits and personnel
Credits adapted from AllMusic.

 Sandro Cavazza – featured artist
 Kygo – featured artist, primary artist

Charts

Weekly charts

Year-end charts

Certifications

References

2018 singles
2018 songs
Kygo songs
Sandro Cavazza songs
Music videos shot in Norway
Song recordings produced by Kygo
Songs written by Kygo
Songs written by Sandro Cavazza
Sony Music singles
Ultra Music singles